Regionalliga Südwest  may refer to a number of sports leagues in Southern Germany:

 Fußball-Regionalliga Südwest, a tier-four league in German football, existing since 2012
 Regionalliga Südwest (1963–74), a defunct tier-two league in German football, existing from 1963 to 1974